RCPS may refer to:

Rockdale County School District, also referred to as Rockdale County Public Schools or RCPS
Rockingham County Public Schools, Virginia, U.S.
Rock Point Community School
Royal College of Physicians and Surgeons (disambiguation)
Royal Cornwall Polytechnic Society, Falmouth, England, U.K.
Rigid cellular polystyrene, a building insulation material

See also
RCP (disambiguation)